CBFT-DT (channel 2) is a television station in Montreal, Quebec, Canada, serving as the flagship station of the French-language service of Ici Radio-Canada Télé. It is owned and operated by the Canadian Broadcasting Corporation (known in French as Société Radio-Canada) alongside CBC Television outlet CBMT-DT (channel 6). Both stations share studios at Maison Radio-Canada on René Lévesque Boulevard East in Downtown Montreal, while CBFT-DT's transmitter is located atop Mount Royal.

History
CBFT was the first permanent television station in Canada (an experimental station, VE9EC, had been on the air in Montreal from 1931 to 1935). It launched on September 6, 1952 at 4 p.m., beating CBLT in Toronto by two days. The station went on the air with the movie Aladdin and His Lamp, followed by a cartoon, and then a French film, a news segment and a bilingual variety show. The station aired programming in both French (60 percent) and English (40 percent), a practice common for many stations in Quebec at the time.

This continued until January 10, 1954, when CBMT was launched on VHF channel 6. At that time, all English programming moved to CBMT, while CBFT became a purely French-language station as the flagship of the Télévision de Radio-Canada network for francophone viewers. CBMT's sign-on was hastened by the planned launch of television stations across the border in Burlington, Vermont and Plattsburgh, New York.

Prior to the digital transition, CBFT operated a translator network that stretched across most of Quebec, parts of Ontario, and most of northern Canada (Northwest Territories and Nunavut). Due to a lack of sources for alternative programming, most Radio-Canada stations are effectively semi-satellites of CBFT. For the most part, their schedules are largely identical to those of CBFT, other than commercials and regional news. This was the case for privately owned Radio-Canada affiliates before the last such station closed in 2021.

Technical information

Subchannel

Analogue-to-digital conversion
CBFT began broadcasting its digital signal on March 22, 2005. On August 31, 2011, when Canadian television stations in CRTC-designated mandatory markets transitioned from analogue to digital broadcasts, the station's digital signal remained on UHF channel 19. Through the use of PSIP, digital television receivers display CBFT-DT's virtual channel as 2.1.

Former rebroadcasters
CBFT had over 30 analogue television rebroadcasters throughout rural Quebec and Labrador. Due to federal funding reductions to the CBC, in April 2012, the CBC responded with substantial budget cuts, which included shutting down CBC's and Radio-Canada's remaining analogue transmitters on July 31, 2012. None of CBC or Radio-Canada's rebroadcasters were converted to digital.

Quebec

Labrador

See also
List of Ici Radio-Canada Télé stations

References

External links
 ICI Grand Montréal 
 
 CBFT at TV Hat
 

BFT-DT
BFT-DT
BFT-DT
BFT-DT
Television channels and stations established in 1952
1952 in Canadian television
1952 establishments in Quebec